Totally Country Vol. 3 is an album in the Totally Hits series.

Track listing
 "Unbroken" – Tim McGraw (4:01)
 "Cry" – Faith Hill (3:48)
 "Speed" – Montgomery Gentry (4:01)
 "Three Wooden Crosses" – Randy Travis (3:22)
 "Blessed" – Martina McBride (4:35)
 "Love You Out Loud" – Rascal Flatts (3:09)
 "Beautiful Mess" – Diamond Rio (3:50)
 "The Baby" – Blake Shelton (3:57)
 "Was That My Life" – Jo Dee Messina (3:50)
 "Not a Day Goes By" – Lonestar (4:11)
 "When You Lie Next to Me" – Kellie Coffey (4:02)
 "American Child" – Phil Vassar (3:14)
 "On a Mission" – Trick Pony (3:00)
 "One Last Time" – Dusty Drake (3:49)
 "Strong Enough to Be Your Man" – Travis Tritt (3:49)
 "Life Goes On" – LeAnn Rimes (3:35)
 "Tonight I Wanna Be Your Man" – Andy Griggs (2:57)
 "19 Somethin'" - Mark Wills (3:20)

Charts

Weekly charts

Year-end charts

References

Totally Country
2003 compilation albums